Daniel Nestor and Nenad Zimonjić defend their 2009 title. They defeated Lleyton Hewitt and Mark Knowles in the final (4–6, 6–3, [10-5]).

Seeds
All seeds receive a bye into the second round.

Draw

Finals

Top half

Bottom half

References
 Doubles Draw

Dou